Margaret Thomas (1842–1929) was an English-born Australian travel writer, poet and artist.

Margaret Thomas may also refer to:
Margaret Murie (1902–2003), American conservationist born Margaret Thomas
Margaret Thomas (hymnwriter) (born 1779), Welsh hymnwriter
Margaret Thomas (painter) (1916–2016), British artist
Margaret Thomas (sport shooter) (born 1953), British sport shooter
Margaret Haig Thomas, 2nd Viscountess Rhondda (1883–1958), Welsh noblewoman, businesswoman, and suffragette
Marlo Thomas (born 1937), American actress, producer, author, and social activist, born Margaret Julia Thomas

See also
Margaret Thomas-Neale (born 1931), British gymnast